Niyarak Rural District is a rural district (dehestan) in Tarom Sofla District, Qazvin County, Qazvin Province, Iran. At the 2006 census, its population was 1,874, in 527 families.  The rural district has 15 villages.

References 

Rural Districts of Qazvin Province
Qazvin County